The Wolverine is a 2013 superhero film featuring the Marvel Comics character Wolverine. It is the sixth installment in the X-Men film series, the second installment in the trilogy of Wolverine films after X-Men Origins: Wolverine (2009), and a spin-off/sequel to X-Men: The Last Stand (2006). Directed by James Mangold from a screenplay written by Scott Frank and Mark Bomback, based on the 1982 limited series Wolverine by Chris Claremont and Frank Miller, it stars Hugh Jackman as Logan / Wolverine, alongside Rila Fukushima, Tao Okamoto, Hiroyuki Sanada, Famke Janssen, and Will Yun Lee. Following the events of X-Men: The Last Stand, Logan travels to Japan, where he engages an old acquaintance in a struggle that has lasting consequences. Stripped of his healing powers, Wolverine must battle deadly samurai while struggling with guilt over Jean Grey's death.

The film's development began in 2009 after the release of X-Men Origins: Wolverine. Christopher McQuarrie was hired to write a screenplay for The Wolverine in August 2009. In October 2010, Darren Aronofsky was hired to direct the film. The project was delayed following Aronofsky's departure and the Tōhoku earthquake and tsunami in March 2011. In June 2011, Mangold was brought on board to replace Aronofsky. Bomback was then hired to rewrite the screenplay in September 2011. The supporting characters were cast in July 2012 with principal photography beginning at the end of the month around New South Wales before moving to Tokyo in August 2012 and back to New South Wales in October 2012. The film was converted to 3D in post-production.

The Wolverine was released by 20th Century Fox in various international markets on July 24, 2013, and in the United States two days later. It received generally positive reviews from critics, with praise for its action sequences, cinematography, and Jackman's performance, though criticism was directed towards the climax. The film earned $414 million worldwide, making it the fifth-highest-grossing film in the series.

An unrated extended cut of the film referred to as the "Unleashed Extended Edition" was released on Blu-ray, featuring more blood and violence, extended action scenes, as well as additional footage during moments of character interaction. A third film titled Logan was released on March 3, 2017.

Plot 

In August 1945, Logan is held in a Japanese POW camp near Nagasaki. During the city's atomic bombing, Logan saves an officer named Ichirō Yashida by shielding him from the blast.

In the present day, Logan lives as a hermit in the Yukon, tormented by hallucinations of Jean Grey, whom he was forced to kill to save the world. He is located by Yukio, a mutant with the ability to foresee people's deaths, on behalf of Ichirō, now the CEO of a technology zaibatsu. Ichirō, who is dying of cancer, wants Logan to accompany Yukio to Japan so that he may repay his life debt. In Tokyo, Logan meets Ichirō's son Shingen and granddaughter Mariko. There, Ichirō offers to transfer Logan's healing abilities into his own body, thus saving Ichirō's life and alleviating Logan of his near-immortality, which Logan views as a curse. Believing he is acting on his friend’s best interests however, Logan refuses and prepares to leave the following day. That night, Ichirō's physician Dr. Green introduces something into Logan's body, but Logan dismisses it as a dream.

The next morning, Yukio informs Logan that Ichirō has died. At the funeral, Yakuza gangsters attempt to kidnap Mariko, but Logan and Mariko escape together into the urban sprawl of Tokyo. Logan is shot and his wounds do not heal as quickly as they should. After fighting off more Yakuza on a bullet train, Logan and Mariko hide in a local love hotel. Meanwhile, Ichirō's bodyguard Harada meets with Dr. Green who, after demonstrating her mutant powers on him, demands he find Logan and Mariko. Logan and Mariko travel to Ichirō's house in Nagasaki, and the two slowly fall in love. In Tokyo, Yukio has a vision of Logan dying, and goes to warn him. Before Yukio arrives, Mariko is captured by the Yakuza. After interrogating one of the kidnappers, Logan and Yukio confront Mariko's fiancé, corrupt Minister of Justice Noburo Mori. Mori confesses that he conspired with Shingen to have the Yakuza kidnap Mariko because Ichirō left control of the company to Mariko, and not Shingen.

Mariko is brought before Shingen at Ichirō's estate when ninjas led by Harada attack and whisk her away. Logan and Yukio arrive later and, using Ichirō's X-ray machine, discover a robotic parasite attached to Logan's heart, suppressing his healing ability. Logan cuts himself open and extracts the device. During the operation, Shingen attacks but Yukio holds him off long enough for Logan to recover and kill him. Logan follows Mariko's trail to the village of Ichirō's birth, where he is captured by Harada's ninjas. Logan is placed in a machine by Dr. Green, who reveals her plans to extract his healing factor and introduces him to the Silver Samurai, an electromechanical suit of Japanese armour with energized katanas made of adamantium. Mariko escapes from Harada, who believes he is acting in Mariko's interests, and manages to free Logan from the machine. Harada sees the error of his ways and is killed by the Silver Samurai while helping Logan escape.

Meanwhile, Yukio arrives and kills Dr. Green. As Logan fights the Silver Samurai, the Silver Samurai severs Logan's adamantium claws and begins to extract his healing abilities, revealing himself to be Ichirō, who had faked his death. Ichirō regains his youth, but Mariko intervenes and stabs Ichirō with Logan's severed claws. Logan regenerates his bone claws and kills Ichirō. Logan collapses and has one final hallucination of Jean, in which he decides to finally let her go. Mariko becomes CEO of Yashida Industries and bids farewell to Logan as he prepares to leave Japan. Yukio vows to stay by Logan's side as his bodyguard, and they depart to places unknown.

In a mid-credits scene, Logan returns to the United States two years later and is approached at the airport by Charles Xavier and Erik Lehnsherr, who warn him of a weapon humans are creating that would bring the end to the mutant race.

Cast 
 Hugh Jackman as Logan / Wolverine: A mutant, whose prodigious healing abilities and adamantium infused skeleton combine to make him virtually immortal.
 Hiroyuki Sanada as Shingen: Ichirō's son as well as Mariko's father and corporate rival, who is proficient in kendo.
 Tao Okamoto as Mariko: Ichirō's granddaughter, whose life becomes threatened as a result of her grandfather's will. 
 Rila Fukushima as Yukio: A mutant who has precognitive abilities and one of the deadliest assassins in Ichirō's clan. 
 Famke Janssen as Jean Grey: A mutant, former member and former medical doctor of the X-Men who was killed by Logan.
 Will Yun Lee as Harada: A former lover of Mariko and head of the Black Ninja Clan, sworn to protect the Yashida family.
 Svetlana Khodchenkova as Viper: A mutant, who has an immunity to toxins.
 Haruhiko Yamanouchi as Yashida: Shingen's father, Mariko's grandfather and the founder of Yashida Industries, a powerful technology zaibatsu.
 Ken Yamamura portrays young Yashida when saved by Logan during the atomic bombing of Nagasaki.
 Brian Tee as Noburo: A corrupt minister of justice, who is engaged to Mariko.

Archive audio of Lynn Collins from X-Men Origins: Wolverine is used to represent her character Kayla Silverfox during a dream being had by Logan, while Patrick Stewart and Ian McKellen reprise their roles as Charles Xavier / Professor X and Erik Lehnsherr / Magneto in cameo appearances during the mid-credits scene.

Production

Casting 
Jackman also portrayed Wolverine in the previous X-Men films. In terms of his character, Jackman views Wolverine as "the ultimate outsider" and that "the great battle, I always thought with Wolverine, is the battle within himself". Regarding Logan's struggle with extreme longevity, Jackman said, "He realizes everyone he loves dies, and his whole life is full of pain. So it's better that he just escapes. He can't die really. He just wants to get away from everything." Jackman stated that he ate six meals a day in preparation for the role. Jackman contacted Dwayne Johnson for some tips on bulking up for the film, suggesting that he gain a pound a week by eating 6,000 calories a day for six months which consisted of "an awful lot of chicken, steak and brown rice"

Khodchenkova said about Viper, "[She] doesn't really have many people that she cares about, most of them she just uses for her own purpose." Mangold said, "as her name would imply, she's kind of snakelike," and that Viper views Logan "like a great hunter might view hunting a lion in his quarry." The film does not reference Viper's comic book history as an agent of Hydra, due to rights issues with Marvel Studios.

Development 

In September 2007, Gavin Hood, director of X-Men Origins: Wolverine, speculated that there would be a sequel, which would be set in Japan. During one of the post-credits scenes of the film, Logan is seen drinking at a bar in Japan. Such a location was the subject of Chris Claremont and Frank Miller's 1982 limited series on the character, which was not in the first film as Jackman felt "what we need to do is establish who [Logan] is and find out how he became Wolverine". Jackman stated the Claremont-Miller series is his favorite Wolverine story. Of the Japanese arc, Jackman also stated, "I won't lie to you, I have been talking to writers... I'm a big fan of the Japanese saga in the comic book." Before X-Men Origins: Wolverines release, Lauren Shuler Donner approached Simon Beaufoy to write the script, but he did not feel confident enough to commit. By May 4, 2009, Jackman's company Seed Productions was preparing several projects, including a sequel to X-Men Origins: Wolverine to be set in Japan, but neither Jackman nor Seed has a production credit on the completed 2013 sequel. On May 5, 2009, just days after the opening weekend of X-Men Origins: Wolverine, the sequel was officially confirmed.

Christopher McQuarrie, who went uncredited for his work on X-Men, was hired to write the screenplay for the Wolverine sequel in August 2009. According to Shuler-Donner, the sequel would focus on the relationship between Wolverine and Mariko, the daughter of a Japanese crime lord, and what happens to him in Japan. Wolverine would have a different fighting style due to Mariko's father having "this stick-like weapon. There'll be samurai, ninja, katana blades, different forms of martial arts—mano-a-mano, extreme fighting." She continued: "We want to make it authentic so I think it's very likely we'll be shooting in Japan. I think it's likely the characters will speak English rather than Japanese with subtitles." In January 2010, at the People's Choice Awards, Jackman stated that the film would start shooting sometime in 2011, and in March 2010 McQuarrie declared that the screenplay was finished for production to start in January the following year. Sources indicated Darren Aronofsky was in negotiations to direct the film after Bryan Singer turned down the offer.

Pre-production 

In October 2010, Jackman confirmed that Aronofsky would direct the film. Jackman commented that with Aronofsky directing, Wolverine 2 will not be "usual" stating, "This is, hopefully for me, going to be out of the box. It's going to be the best one, I hope... Well, I would say that, but I really do feel that, and I feel this is going to be very different. This is Wolverine. This is not Popeye. He's kind of dark... But, you know, this is a change of pace. Chris McQuarrie, who wrote The Usual Suspects, has written the script, so that'll give you a good clue. [Aronofsky's] going to make it fantastic. There's going to be some meat on the bones. There will be something to think about as you leave the theater, for sure". The film was scheduled to begin principal photography in March 2011 in New York City before the production moves to Japan for the bulk of shooting.

While Jackman in 2008 had characterized the film as "a sequel to Origins", Aronofsky in November 2010 said the film, now titled The Wolverine, was a "one-off" rather than a sequel. Also in November, Fox Filmed Entertainment sent out a press release stating that they have signed Aronofsky and his production company Protozoa Pictures to a new two-year, overall deal. Under the deal, Protozoa would develop and produce films for both 20th Century Fox and Fox Searchlight Pictures. Aronofsky's debut picture under the pact would have been The Wolverine.

In March 2011, Aronofsky bowed out of directing the film, saying in a statement, "As I talked more about the film with my collaborators at Fox, it became clear that the production of The Wolverine would keep me out of the country for almost a year... I was not comfortable being away from my family for that length of time. I am sad that I won't be able to see the project through, as it is a terrific script and I was very much looking forward to working with my friend, Hugh Jackman, again". Fox also decided to be "in no rush" to start the production due to the damage incurred in Japan by the 2011 Tōhoku earthquake and tsunami. Despite this, Jackman said the project was moving ahead. "It's too early to call on Japan, I'm not sure where they're at. So now we're finding another director, but Fox is very anxious to make the movie and we're moving ahead full steam to find another director".

In May 2011, Fox had a list of eight candidates to replace Aronofsky, including directors José Padilha, Doug Liman, Antoine Fuqua, Mark Romanek, Justin Lin, Gavin O'Connor, James Mangold and Gary Shore. In June 2011, Fox entered negotiations with Mangold and intended to start principal photography in fall 2011. In July 2011, Jackman said he planned to begin filming in October and that he would fight the Silver Samurai.

In August 2011, The Vancouver Sun reported that filming would take place from November 11, 2011 to March 1, 2012 at the Canadian Motion Picture Park in Burnaby, British Columbia. Almost immediately, filming was postponed to spring 2012 so Jackman could work on Les Misérables. In September, Mark Bomback was hired to rewrite McQuarrie's script. At one point, Bomback tried to work Rogue into the script, but he rejected it for being "goofy" and "problematic". In February 2012, a July 26, 2013, release date was set, and in April, filming was set to begin in August 2012 in Australia, which would serve as the primary location due to financial and tax incentives.

In July 2012, actors Hiroyuki Sanada, Hal Yamanouchi, Tao Okamoto and Rila Fukushima had been cast as Shingen, Ichirō, Mariko and Yukio, respectively. Additionally, Will Yun Lee was cast as Harada, and Brian Tee as Noburo Mori. By July 2012, Deadline.com said Jessica Biel would play Viper. However, at the 2012 San Diego Comic-Con International, Biel said her role in the film was "not a done deal", explaining, "People keep talking about this. I don't know anything about it. It's a little bit too soon for that kind of an announcement". A few days later, negotiations between Biel and 20th Century Fox had broken down. Later in July, Fox had begun talks with Svetlana Khodchenkova to take over the role. Somewhat unusually for action movies, The Wolverine features four female lead roles and "passes the Bechdel Test early and often", according to Vulture. Mangold noted that he wrote his heroines so that "they all have missions. They all have jobs to do other than be the object of affection", intent of avoiding the "worn out" trope of the woman in jeopardy.

In August 2012, Guillermo del Toro revealed he had been interested in directing the film, as the Japanese arc was his favorite Wolverine story. After meeting with Jim Gianopulos and Jackman, del Toro passed, deciding he did not wish to spend two to three years of his life working on the movie.

Filming 

On a production budget of $120 million, principal photography began on July 30, 2012. Shuler Donner had to be absent through most of the production due to breast cancer, with her treatment ending just before post-production begun. Some of the earliest scenes were shot at the Bonna Point Reserve in Kurnell, New South Wales, which doubled as a Japanese prisoner-of-war camp. Filming there ended on August 2, 2012, with production scheduled to continue around Sydney followed by a few weeks in Japan before wrapping up in mid-November. On August 3, 2012, production moved to Picton, which doubled as a town in Canada's Yukon region.

On August 25, 2012, Mangold said that production moved to Tokyo and began shooting. On September 4, 2012, filming took place outside Fukuyama Station in Fukuyama, Hiroshima. Filming in Tomonoura, a port in the Ichichi ward of Fukuyama, concluded on September 11, 2012.

On October 8, 2012, production returned to Sydney with filming on Erskine Street near Cockle Bay. The following week, the film shot in Parramatta, which doubled as a Japanese city. Also in October, Mangold revealed that the film follows the events of X-Men: The Last Stand, saying, "Where this film sits in the universe of the films is after them all. Jean Grey is gone, most of the X-Men are disbanded or gone, so there's a tremendous sense of isolation for [Wolverine]." Mangold later stated that in the fight scenes, "there's an urgency and a kind of intensity and hand to hand physicality that I hope is a little different than everything else out there." On October 25, 2012 production relocated to Sydney Olympic Park in western Sydney. The set was made into a Japanese village draped in snow with filming beginning on November 1, 2012. On November 10, 2012, filming took place on a back street in Surry Hills. The set, constructed on Brisbane St., was transformed to look like a Japanese street with Japanese signage and vehicles scattered throughout. Principal photography concluded on November 21, 2012.

Reshoots took place in Montréal, including the credits scene where Magneto and Professor X warn Wolverine of a new threat. Said scene was contributed by Bryan Singer and Simon Kinberg, writers of X-Men: Days of Future Past, as a way to "reintroduce Patrick Stewart into the universe" and set up their film. Mangold stated that while production of The Wolverine started before Days of Future Past and thus the film was mostly focused on being a self-contained story, he was able to collaborate with Singer to "make things groove together".

Post-production 

In October 2012, it was reported that The Wolverine would be converted to 3D, making it the first 3D release for one of 20th Century Fox's Marvel films. Visual effects for the film were completed by Weta Digital, Rising Sun Pictures (RSP), Iloura, and Shade VFX.

In order to recreate the atomic bombing of Nagasaki, RSP studied natural phenomena such as volcanoes, instead of relying on archived footage of atomic blasts, and recreated the effects digitally. They also replaced the Sydney cityscape on the horizon with views of Nagasaki. The walking bear featured in the Yukon scenes was created with computer graphics by Weta Digital, while Make-Up Effects Group built a 12-foot-tall animatronic bear, that was used for shots of the creature dying after it had been hit by poisoned arrows fired by hunters.

For a fight scene taking place on top of a speeding bullet train, the actors and stunt performers filmed on wires above a set piece surrounded by a greenscreen. The moving background, filmed on an elevated freeway in Tokyo, was added later. Weta Digital visual effects supervisor Martin Hill said the team adopted a "Google Street View method", explaining "But instead of having a big panoramic cam on top of a van, we built a rig that had eight 45-degree angle Red Epic [cameras] that gave us massive resolution driving down all the massive lanes of the freeway. We let a bit of air out of the tires of the van and kept a constant 60 kilometers an hour. So if we shot at 48 fps we just needed to speed up the footage by 10 times to give us the 300 kilometers an hour required."

The Silver Samurai, rendered by Weta Digital, was based on a model that had been 3D printed and chrome painted using electrolysis. Stunt performer Shane Rangi, wearing a motion capture suit, stood on stilts while filming as the Silver Samurai. Rangi's performance was then used to animate the digital character. Hill said the main challenge was creating the Silver Samurai's highly reflective surface, "He's pretty much chrome. We were worried that he was going to look incredibly digital and that it was going to be very hard to make him look solid and real and not just like a mirrored surface."

The original assembly cut of the film ran around two hours and 35 minutes. The mid-credit scene was written by Simon Kinberg and shot by the X-Men: Days of Future Past crew, though Mangold directed the scene.

Music 

In September 2012, Marco Beltrami, who previously scored James Mangold's film 3:10 to Yuma (2007), announced that he had signed on to score The Wolverine. Following Mangold's noir and Spaghetti Western inspirations for the film, Beltrami explained, "I think I do every movie as a western whether it is or not, so there's definitely some of the spaghetti western influence on my music throughout the score, and I guess throughout a lot of my work. I wouldn't say there was a particular movie that influenced me more than something else. There was nothing that I was trying to mimic or anything." On associating sounds with the film's primary location, Beltrami said, "I think the last thing that Jim [Mangold] and I wanted to do was Japanese music associated with Japanese places. There's a reference; I do use Japanese instruments, [but] not really in a traditional way." The score was performed by an 85-piece ensemble of the Hollywood Studio Symphony at the Newman Scoring Stage located at 20th Century Fox Studios. The album was released by Sony Classical Records on July 23, 2013.

Release

Theatrical
The Wolverine was released in 2D and 3D theaters on July 3, 2013, in various international markets, and in the United States two days later. The film was titled Wolverine: Immortal in Brazil and Spanish-language markets. The film premiered in Japan on September 13, 2013, under the title .

Marketing 

On October 29, 2012, director James Mangold and actor Jackman hosted a live chat from the set of the film. The chat took place on the official website and the official YouTube account of the film.

The first American trailer and international trailer of The Wolverine were released on March 27, 2013. Empire magazine said "This is all very encouraging stuff from director James Mangold, a man who's obviously not afraid of tweaking the original source material to serve his own ends." The trailer was later attached to G.I. Joe: Retaliation. The second American trailer was then released on April 18, 2013, and was screened at CinemaCon in Las Vegas.

The third American trailer was released on May 21, 2013, and then on June 13, 2013, the second international trailer was released.

On July 20, 2013, 20th Century Fox presented The Wolverine along with Dawn of the Planet of the Apes and X-Men: Days of Future Past to the 2013 San Diego Comic-Con with Jackman and Mangold in attendance to present new footage of the film.

20th Century Fox partnered with automotive company Audi to promote the film with their sports car Audi R8 and their motorcycle Ducati. Other partners included sugar-free chewing-gum brand 5 and casual dining restaurant company Red Robin.

Home media 
The Wolverine was released on DVD, Blu-ray, and Blu-ray 3D on December 3, 2013. The Blu-ray set features an exclusive unrated extended cut of the film referred to as the "Unleashed Extended Edition". This version of the film was screened for the first time at 20th Century Fox Studios on November 19, 2013. It contains 12 extra minutes, primarily including an extended battle with Harada's ninjas during the start of the film's third act as well as additional footage during moments of character interaction. The BBFC gives its running time as 132 minutes and 22 seconds, only six minutes longer.

Reception

Box office 
Along with the improvements in critical reception, The Wolverine outgrossed Origins in total box office, though earned less domestically. The film closed in US theaters on December 5, 2013, grossing $132,556,852 in North America (as opposed to $179,883,157 for the earlier film) and $282,271,394 in other territories (as opposed to the earlier film's $193,179,707), for a worldwide total of $414,828,246. The film earned $139.6 million on its worldwide opening weekend. When compared to the rest of the X-Men film franchise, The Wolverine has garnered somewhat mixed results in terms of box office success. While its domestic gross is greater than the production budget, it is still lower than the other five films of the franchise, with its domestic box office total being roughly $45.1 million less than the franchise's average. However, its overseas total currently exceeds the franchise's average by roughly $75.7 million and is significantly more than any of the other X-Men films. With a worldwide total of roughly $414.8 million, The Wolverine was at that time the third-highest-grossing film.

In North America, the film opened at the top of the box office on its opening day, with $20.7 million, with $4 million coming from Thursday late-night showings. It held on to the number one spot through its first weekend, with $53,113,752, which was the lowest opening of the series until 2019's Dark Phoenix was released.

Outside North America, the film topped the box office on its opening weekend with $86.5 million from 100 countries. The film achieved the highest opening of the franchise, passing X-Men: The Last Stands $76.2 million opening.

Critical response 
The review aggregator website Rotten Tomatoes reported  approval rating with an average rating of  based on  reviews. The website's consensus reads, "Although its final act succumbs to the usual cartoonish antics, The Wolverine is one superhero movie that manages to stay true to the comics while keeping casual viewers entertained." On Metacritic, the film has a score of 61 out of 100, based on reviews from 46 critics, indicating "generally favorable reviews". Audiences polled by CinemaScore gave the film an average grade of "A−", on a scale from A+ to F.

Richard Roeper of the Chicago Sun-Times gave it a grade of "B+", praising Jackman's performance as "strong, solid entertainment" and "a serious, sometimes dark and deliberately paced story." Christy Lemire, writing for the website of Roger Ebert, said that the film "features some breathtakingly suspenseful action sequences, exquisite production and costume design and colorful characters, some of whom register more powerfully than others." Variety film critic Peter Debruge called the film "an entertaining and surprisingly existential digression from his usual X-Men exploits. Though Wolvie comes across a bit world-weary and battle-worn by now, Jackman is in top form, taking the opportunity to test the character's physical and emotional extremes. Fans might've preferred bigger action or more effects, but Mangold does them one better, recovering the soul of a character whose near-immortality made him tiresome." James Buchanan of TV Guide.com gave it 3 out of 4 stars, calling it "A rare comic-to-film adaptation that doesn't sacrifice substance for the sake of thrilling action." Scott Collura of IGN praised the film giving it an 8.5 out of 10 and stated, "The Wolverine is a stand alone adventure for the classic character that reminds us that there's more to this genre than universe-building and crossovers. ... [The] story paints a deep and compelling portrait of Logan, a haunted character that Jackman still finds new ways to play all these years later." Peter Travers of Rolling Stone felt that despite the film's final act "sink[ing] into CGI shit", Jackman's performance "still has the juice" and Mangold's directing "shows style and snap."

Henry Barnes of The Guardian derided the film, giving it 2 out of 5 stars and stating, "Hugh Jackman's sixth time out in the claws and hair combo is looking increasingly wearied, as the backstory gets more complicated and the action gets duller and flatter." Joe Neumaier of the New York Daily News offered a similar view, saying "Hugh Jackman has the role of the mutant superhero down pat, but the rest of the film is the same old slice and dice."

Accolades

Sequel 

By October 2013, 20th Century Fox had begun negotiations with both Jackman and Mangold to return for a previously untitled installment. Mangold was scheduled to write the treatment, with Lauren Shuler Donner returning to produce. On March 20, 2014, Fox announced that the sequel would be released March 3, 2017. David James Kelly was hired to write the script, and Jackman was set to reprise his role as Wolverine. By the following month, screenwriter Michael Green was attached to the film. Mangold tweeted that filming would start in early 2016. Patrick Stewart said in August 2015 that he will reprise his role as Charles Xavier. Liev Schreiber, who portrayed Victor Creed in X-Men Origins: Wolverine, said in February 2016 that he was in talks to reprise his role in the sequel. By April 2016, Boyd Holbrook had been cast as head of security for a global enterprise set against Wolverine, and Richard E. Grant as a "mad scientist type". Simon Kinberg that month said the film will be set in the future. Toward the end of the month, Stephen Merchant was cast as Caliban. In May 2016, Eriq La Salle and Elise Neal were cast in unspecified roles. In May, Kinberg said filming had started and that he planned it to be an R-rated movie. Shiori Kutsuna was later cast as a younger version of Yukio in Deadpool 2, replacing Rila Fukushima.

Notes

References

Further reading 
 Gray, Simon. "Rapturous Action". American Cinematographer. Vol. 94, No. 8. August 2013. . Hollywood: California. ASC Holding Corp. Pages 56–65. Behind-the-scenes article on The Wolverine focusing on the film's camera work, lighting, etc. 9 pages, 17 color photos.

External links 

 
 
 

2013 films
2013 3D films
2013 science fiction films
2013 science fiction action films
2010s action adventure films
2010s American films
2010s British films
2010s English-language films
2010s Japanese-language films
2010s superhero films
20th Century Fox films
American 3D films
American action films
American sequel films
British 3D films
British action films
British sequel films
Film spin-offs
Films about the atomic bombings of Hiroshima and Nagasaki
Films based on works by Chris Claremont
Films based on works by Frank Miller
Films directed by James Mangold
Films produced by Lauren Shuler Donner
Films scored by Marco Beltrami
Films set in Japan
Films set in Nagasaki Prefecture
Films set in Tokyo
Films set in Yukon
Films shot in Australia
Films shot in Fukuyama
Films shot in Tokyo
Films with screenplays by Mark Bomback
Films with screenplays by Scott Frank
Japan in non-Japanese culture
Live-action films based on Marvel Comics
Ninja films
Samurai films
Superhero adventure films
TSG Entertainment films
Wolverine (comics) films
Wolverine (film series)
Yakuza films